Văn Mai Hương (born 27 September 1994 in Hanoi) is a Vietnamese Pop Music singer.  She was the runner-up of Season 3 of Vietnam Idol in 2010, before becoming a mainstay in the industry.

Career

2010: Vietnam Idol
As a participant of the third season of Vietnam Idol, she was the youngest among the top 10 contestants and was known as a highly technical performer. During the final competitive show, she sang  "Trái tim âm nhạc", "Hot n Cold", "Cảm ơn Tình Yêu", and "Á quân" and came in second place to Uyên Linh.

2011-2012: Debut "Nếu như anh đến" and the debut album Hãy mỉm cười

After Vietnam Idol, she released a sponsored song "Ngày mới trắng hồng" in partnership with an international cosmetics brand.

In June 2011, she released her official single "Nếu như anh đến" (translated: As If You'd Shown Up), a dance-pop/R&B song written by Nguyễn Đức Cường and produced by  Huy Tuấn.  It was released digitally on Zing platforms and as an EP.  That August, she release a Music Video directed by Film Ninja Productions that featured both an acoustic and the official electronic version of the songs while also celebrating the burgeoning singer-songwriter cafe scene of Vietnam.

The success of "Nếu như anh đến", led to a second single "Ngày chung đôi" and her first album. "Hãy mỉm cười". Upon the release of the album, Hương remarked, "At 17 years old, I don't want to perform songs that might feel too old for my character and personality.  I wanted to make music for my fellow teenagers.  I want to make pop music that is dignified and modern to help create my distinct artistic identity.

2013-2017: New Genres with Mười tám+, Mona Lisa, and Ngay Gan Anh
In 2013, Huong released her second album "Mười tám +", where she released down-tempo ballads and R&B, alongside the dance-pop she had become known for.

In 2014, she collaborated with Dương Triệu Vũ to release ""Ngày gần anh".  She would win "Favorite Female Singer at the 2014 HTV Awards. Soon after, she would cancel many shows and withdraw from the industry, later pointing to her struggles with Depression.  She would come back at the end of 2015 with the single "Mona Lisa", a collaboration with Khắc Hưng and contained elements of Swing-Jazz In 2016, she would feature in Phạm Hồng Phước's song "Thời thanh xuân sẽ qua". She would also serve as a judge on Vietnam Idol Kids. In 2017, she released the ballad "Những khát khao ấy".

2018-2021:  "Hương (Scent)"

In 2021, she released her third full album "Hương (Scent)".

Discography

Nếu như anh đến (EP) (2011)
Hãy mỉm cười (2011)
Mười tám + (2013)
Hương (2021)
Những Ngày Mưa Đến Muộn (EP) (2022)

Singles

Promotional singles

References 

1994 births
Living people
Vietnam Idol
21st-century Vietnamese women singers